The Bour-Davis was an American automobile manufactured from 1916 until 1922. The car took its name from two of the founders of the company; Robert C Davis and Charles J Bour. Production of the car was started in Detroit, before moving to Frankfort, Indiana, in 1918.
A distinctive feature of the Model 17 and Model 18B cars built in Detroit and Frankfort was the slightly slanted and pointed radiator.
Prices ranged from $1250 to $1500 in 1916, rising to $1650 in 1919.

In 1918 the company was taken over by the Shadbourne Brothers of Chicago, who reorganised the company, with production now located in Shreveport, Louisiana, from 1919 onwards. Company advertising placed heavy emphasis on the Bour-Davis's new home, with the car being referred to as the "Pride of Shreveport". A contest was held amongst readers of the "Shreveport Times" for a new name for the car. Although the name "Louisianne" was chosen, this name was never adopted.  Features of the Bour-Davis included a radiator placed slightly ahead of the front axle, and the continuation of the leather front seat over the seat's top and down to the rear floor.
The Model 21 and Model 21S were powered by a Continental Straight-6 engine, with prices ranging from $1700 for a 1920 Model 20 tourer, up to $2300 for a 1922 Model 21S tourer.

In 1923 the company was taken over by JM Ponder and the Ponder Motor Manufacturing Company, but lack of finance lead to production never occurring. Total production of the Bour-Davis between 1916 and 1922 was approximately 1500 cars.

See also 

List of automobile manufacturers
List of defunct automobile manufacturers

References

External links
Restored 1921 Model 21S touring car
1921 Model S touring car advertisement
1922 Model S touring car advertisement

Defunct motor vehicle manufacturers of the United States
Motor vehicle manufacturers based in Michigan
Motor vehicle manufacturers based in Indiana
Motor vehicle manufacturers based in Louisiana
1910s cars
1920s cars
Companies based in Detroit
American companies established in 1916
Vehicle manufacturing companies established in 1916
Vehicle manufacturing companies disestablished in 1923
1916 establishments in Michigan
1923 disestablishments in Indiana
Defunct manufacturing companies based in Michigan
Defunct manufacturing companies based in Indiana
Defunct manufacturing companies based in Louisiana
History of Detroit
History of Shreveport, Louisiana
American companies disestablished in 1923